Iain Andrew O'Connell (born 9 October 1970) is an English former footballer who played as a central defender. He is currently manager of Great Wakering Rovers.

Playing career
After playing for the club as a youth player, O'Connell signed professional terms with hometown club Southend United in 1989. O'Connell made four Football League appearances for the club during the 1989–90 season, before being released. In 1990, O'Connell signed for Dover Athletic, making over 250 appearances in seven years at the club. In August 1997, O'Connell joined fellow Kent club Margate for a fee of £4,000. O'Connell made over 200 appearances in all competitions for Margate, scoring 19 times. On 24 December 2003, O'Connell signed for Chelmsford City. Chelmsford initially made an offer for O'Connell in the summer of 2003, however he declined the offer in order to stay at Margate.

Managerial career
In February 2005, O'Connell was appointed player-manager of Great Wakering Rovers. In the 2007–08 season, O'Connell retired from playing, focusing solely on managing Great Wakering. In February 2010, O'Connell returned to Margate as manager, before leaving in March 2011. In February 2017, O'Connell returned to Great Wakering Rovers as manager. O'Connell guided the club to the 2017–18 Essex Senior League title, before resigning from his post in July 2018. He returned as manager of Great Wakering in May 2022.

References

1970 births
Living people
Association football defenders
English footballers
English football managers
Sportspeople from Southend-on-Sea
Southend United F.C. players
Dover Athletic F.C. players
Margate F.C. players
Chelmsford City F.C. players
Great Wakering Rovers F.C. players
Great Wakering Rovers F.C. managers
Margate F.C. managers
English Football League players